The Be 4/6 12301 was one of four test locomotives ordered by the Schweizerische Bundesbahnen (Swiss Federal Railways) (SBB) in June 1917.
For gaining experience for ordering electrical locomotives this locomotive should – as her three sisters Be 3/5 12201, Be 4/6 12302 and Ce 6/8I14201 – have been used for services on the Gotthardbahn (Gotthard railway). The Be 4/6 12301 was the alternative design of MFO for a fast train locomotive for the Gotthard railway line. She was designed and built according to the requirement specifications of the SBB. But – except for occasional trips to the maintenance shop of Bellinzona – did not appear on the Gotthard railway line. The design was intrinsically reliable. The locomotive operated for 44 years in very various services. The locomotive drivers liked the locomotive because her driving behaviour was very smooth even at top speed. But technically the locomotive was much more complicated than their sisters Be 4/6 12302 and Be 4/6 12303-12342.

History 
In November 1913 the executive board of the Schweizerische Bundesbahnen (Swiss Federal Railways) (SBB) decided to electrify Gotthardbahn (Gotthard railway) from Erstfeld to Biasca. Due to World War One the SBB had to reduce schedules more and more because shortage of coal. Therefore, – in autumn 1918 – on Sundays only milk trains were running.That's why the SBB forced – beside other important lines – the electrification of the Gotthard railway line. This electrification was completed 1920.For the traction on those lines the SBB urgently needed passenger- and freight locomotives.

Requirement specifications 
The SBB demanded from the industry compliance with the subsequent requirements:
 Top speed of 75 km/h
 Haulage of towed load of 300 t at a gradient of 26 ‰ with 50 km/h
 Reliable run-up with this load at a gradient of 26 ‰ and acceleration to 50 km/h within 4 minutes
 Three outward and return journeys Arth-Goldau – Chiasso within 24 hours (1360 km)
 Electrical brake for deceleration of the locomotive weight at slopes
 Multiple-unit control

Commissioning and proposal 
The contract was awarded as follows:

Maschinenfabrik Oerlikon (MFO). Design and construction of the passenger locomotive

Besides compliance with the requirement specifications the designers got big freedom in the work out of their designs.

Delivery date
The locomotive was delivered on 21 March 1919 as the first of the four test locomotives. One month later it was already in service for instruction trips for the locomotive personnel.

Technical details

The mechanical part

Running gear 
The running gear consisted of two bogies. In both bogies two drive-axles, one idle-axle in a Bissel truck and a jackshaft were installed. The idle-axles had a side-play of 2x70 mm relative to the bogie frame.

Transmission of tractive force 
The tractive force was transmitted from the drive-axles to the bogies. From there the force was carried over to the bogie-mounted towing hook and the buffers. In between the bogies were connected with a so-called tender coupling, which consists of one main rod and two auxiliary rods. The locomotive body was not engaged in the transmission of tractive force.

Drive 
Two motors were mounted in both bogie frames. Those two motors drove big cogwheels over both-side spring-loaded sprockets. The big cogwheels drove a jackshaft. The jackshaft drove a slit coupling rod which drove – over a vertical crosshead – the crank pins of the two drive-axles of the bogie.

Locomotive body 
The locomotive body consisted of single bridging slab. On this slab the – partly dismountable – body parts were fixed with screws.The bridging slab laid on the bogies using pivot bearings located under the drivers cabs. Beside those two spring-loaded bearings were mounted at the outer part of the body. Additionally bearings with rolls were located inside of the body behind the motors.On the bogies – in front of the cabs – cabinets were mounted. Those cabinets were separated by a center gangway. This gangway – as the crossover-plate and the front door – were considered as necessary to access the locomotive from the train at that time.For the ventilation of the motors two – from both cabs –pneumatically controlled blinds were mounted at both sides of the body.

Braking equipment 
The automatic Westinghouse air brake and the locomotive brake acted over a separate brake cylinder to both sides of the driving wheels of each drive-axle. The idle-wheels did not have brakes. Each cab was equipped with a handbrake which acted to the respective bogie.

Electrical part

Primary circuit 
Two diamond-shaped pantographs – controllable with a valve in each cab – lead the current from the catenary to the two electrical cutting knives on the roof of the locomotive body. These cutting knives could be controlled manually from the engine room. From these cutting knives, the current was transferred to the oil-cooled transformer over a lightning protection inductor and the oil-propelled main switch. The transformer was located in the center of the locomotive body.  On the high voltage side, the transformer was switchable for either 15,000 V or 7500 V. This arrangement was necessary since the SBB decided to supply the Gotthard railway line at start only with 7500 V because the main operation was still steam.  The SBB was considering that the carbon black on the insulators of the catenary could lead to shortcuts when very high voltage was used. The low-voltage side of the transformer was bifid and equipped with 11 taps. The two camshaft switches were mounted in longitudinal direction on both sides of the transformer. It was possible – as at the Be 3/5 12201 – to select 23 steps. For handling the step switches, the locomotive driver had to turn a vertical crank handle once for each step. It was possible to shut off power by running down both step switches with a special handle. If one step switch failed it could be separated. With the remaining one it was possible to continue the trip with the 12 steps of the other one. The four pneumatic controlled reverse switches were placed on the motors. They were connected in parallel.

Auxiliary systems 
The locomotive consisted of the subsequent listed auxiliary systems operated with 220 V:
 two piston compressors in the cabinets in front and back on the left side
 a fan on the roof for the forced air ventilation of the cooling-ribs of the transformer shaft
 two fans for the ventilation of the motors
 one Motor-generator for battery charging in the cabinet in front/right
 cab heating

The train heating system was fed over a separate oil-propelled main switch with 1000 V.

Electrical brake 
The electrical brake was tested in June 1919 at the Lötschberg railway. It was subsequently removed since it was considered too unreliable.

Multiple-unit control 
The locomotive was equipped with a multiple-unit control, but it was never tested at all.

Service 
The locomotive was delivered on 21 March 1919 as the first of the four test locomotives. Instruction trips were undertaken almost immediately in the region around Berne.
But there were still a lot of teething troubles to cure. Therefore, the locomotive was not used for scheduled services. Another reason were the planned test with the electrical brake on the Lötschbergbahn. 1 September 1919 the locomotive was officially taken over by the SBB. This was followed by services in commuter trains to Spiez and partly to Brig too. After a break in 1920, the locomotive lead trains in planned services together with the Be 4/6 12303-12342 – which were in the delivery phase – over the Lötschberg railway line until Brig.

It was soon obvious that the locomotive never would be used for planned services at the Gotthard railway line. On 31 May 1921 the locomotive had the last planned service at the Lötschberg railway line. Thereafter she led freight trains – from Berne – to Basel and Biel.

From 1937 the locomotive was assigned to the marshalling yard of Lausanne. Her duty was the pulling of freight trains which had to be distributed to the hump.

On 1 January 1962, the locomotive was assigned to the Yverdon main shop for omitting the expensive transfers to the Bellinzona main shop. Yverdon was not very happy about the accession of this veteran. But the end was very close. A short circuit caused an explosion in the transformer. The fire brigade was not able to extinguish the fire at time. The locomotive burned out completely. In August 1963 the locomotive was scrapped in the main shop of Bellinzona.

References 

 
 

Electric locomotives of Switzerland
Be 4 6 12301
15 kV AC locomotives
Standard gauge locomotives of Switzerland
Railway locomotives introduced in 1919